Glenister of the Mounted is a 1926 American silent Western film directed by Harry Garson and starring Maurice 'Lefty' Flynn, Bess Flowers and Lee Shumway.

Cast
 Maurice 'Lefty' Flynn as Sergeant Richard Glenister 
 Bess Flowers as Elizabeth Danrock 
 Lee Shumway as Jack Danrock 
 Walter James as Thorald 
 James Gibson as Rafferty 
 Arthur Millett as Sergeant Major Willis

References

External links
 

1926 films
1926 Western (genre) films
Films directed by Harry Garson
Film Booking Offices of America films
American black-and-white films
Silent American Western (genre) films
1920s English-language films
1920s American films